John Ebenezer Sutherland (1854 – 17 August 1918) was a Scottish Liberal politician.

Education and career
John Sutherland was born at Lossiemouth. He was educated at Aberdeen University. He was a partner in the firm of J & P Sutherland, fish curers of Portsoy and an expert on fishing industry questions. He served on the Committee on Scottish Sea Fisheries in 1917.

Sutherland was Justice of the Peace for Banffshire, member of the Banffshire County Council and was for many years Chairman of the Fordyce School Board. He also served as Chairman of the Scottish Temperance and Social Reform Association.

Parliament

Elgin Burghs by-election, 1905

In 1905, Sutherland was adopted as Liberal candidate for Elgin Burghs for the by-election which was caused by the death of the sitting Liberal MP, Alexander Asher. He won the by-election in a straight fight with Patrick Rose-Innes, the Unionist candidate by a majority of 1,458 votes.

1905-1918

Sutherland held his seat at the 1906 election and at the January and December 1910 general elections. By the time of the December 1910 election, he was so entrenched in his seat that he faced no opponent and was returned unopposed.

Death
He died at his home, Durn House, Portsoy on 17 August 1918.

References

External links 
 

1854 births
1918 deaths
Alumni of the University of Aberdeen
UK MPs 1906–1910
UK MPs 1910–1918
Scottish Liberal Party MPs
Members of the Parliament of the United Kingdom for Scottish constituencies
People from Lossiemouth
Scottish temperance activists